Michael "Mike" O’Mara is an American, journeyman pipefitter, international representative of the United Association of Plumbers, Pipefitters and Sprinklerfitters, and Democratic member of the St. Louis County Council.

Early life and career
O'Mara's father, James, was a member of the St. Louis County Council and a member and leader of the Pipefitters Local 562. O'Mara attended McCluer North High School in Florissant, Missouri, later attending to St. Louis Community College-Florissant Valley. He graduated from St. Louis University with a bachelor's degree in communications. 

He was a soccer player and played for the Kansas City Comets from 1981 to 1982 and for the St. Louis Steamers from 1983 to 1984. He joined the Plumbers and Pipefitters Local 562, where he has been an assistant business manager and is currently a journeyman pipefitter and international representative of the United Association of Plumbers, Pipefitters and Sprinklerfitters. He is married with two children.

Political career
O'Mara represented the fourth district in the St. Louis County Council from 2001, when his father retired from the same seat, to 2016. He represented about 145,000 people in north St. Louis County. He has been Vice-Chairman of the council since 2011 and has previously served as Chairman of the council.

Electoral history

References

Saint Louis University alumni
Year of birth missing (living people)
Living people
Politicians from St. Louis County, Missouri
Missouri Democrats
County commissioners in Missouri